is a retired Japanese baseball player.

He debuted with the Daimai Orions in 1958, playing for the team until he was traded to the Yomiuri Giants at the end of the 1962 season. The Giants traded Yanagida to the Nankai Hawks in the middle of the 1967 season, where he played until retiring in 1970. Yanagida appeared in several Japan Series.

References

External links

1936 births
Nippon Professional Baseball infielders
Nippon Professional Baseball outfielders
Daimai Orions players
Yomiuri Giants players
Nankai Hawks players
Sportspeople from Fukushima Prefecture
Living people